Ramathnal also spelled as Ramathnala is a village in the Sindhanur taluk of Raichur district in the Indian state of Karnataka. Ramathnal is located near to Pothnal stream joining Tungabhadra river. Ramathnal lies on road connecting Pothnal-Balganur.

Demographics
 India census, Ramathnal had a population of 2,008 with 1,004 males and 1,004 females and 392 Households.

See also
Banniganur
Valkamdinni
Yapalaparvi
Olaballari
Sindhanur
Raichur

References

External links
Raichur.nic.in

Villages in Raichur district